Madeline Alice O'Neill also Madeleine O'Neill nee,Madeline Alice Fisher (born 1867/1868) was a British tennis player. She was a two time singles quarter finalist at the 1913 Wimbledon Championships and 1914 Wimbledon Championships, and she won the  Scottish Championships in 1898.

Career
She was born Madeline Alice Fisher in 1867. Since 1905, O'Neill competed in the Wimbledon Championships. In 1909 and 1913, she reached the quarterfinals of the singles competition. In mixed doubles, she could reach the semifinals with Norman Kidson in 1913. She also won the Scottish Championships in 1898.

In 1922, O'Neill took part in the Wimbledon singles for the last time and won two matches. Then at an age of 54, she is until today the oldest player to ever have won a match at the Wimbledon singles.

References 

1860s births
20th-century deaths
British female tennis players
Year of birth uncertain
Year of death missing
Place of birth missing